Klaus Ewerth (28 March 1907 – 20 December 1943) was a German U-boat commander in World War II. He reached the rank of Kapitän zur See with the Kriegsmarine during World War II.

Career
Klaus Ewerth joined the Reichsmarine in 1925. He commissioned the first German U-boat since World War I, the small Type IIA  on 29 June 1935. He left the U-1 on 30 September 1936 to prepare for his next command. Klaus Ewerth commissioned the new Type VIIA  on 3 November 1936. He commanded the boat until 5 December 1936. He then commissioned the new  on 16 December 1936. He would command the boat for almost 2 years, until 31 October 1938. From November 1938 to August 1939, Ewerth served as an instructor at the Naval Academy Mürwik.

He went out on two patrols with the boat, spending 74 days at sea. He sank 4 ships during these patrols, 3 of them were lost to mines laid by U-26. From January 1940 to February 1943 Ewerth served in several staff positions with the U-Boat Command before being assigned to U-boat familiarization in preparation for his command of a new U-boat from March to April 1943.

Death
On 17 April 1943, Ewerth commissioned the huge new Type IXD boat . After almost seven months in training and preparation Ewerth took the boat from Kiel heading in to the South Atlantic as part of the Monsun Gruppe. 33 days later the boat was sunk with all hands, 66 men, on 20 December 1943 in the mid-Atlantic west of Madeira, Portugal by depth charges and Fido homing torpedoes from five Grumman Avenger and Grumman Wildcat aircraft (VC-19) of the American escort carrier USS Bogue.

Summary of career

Ships attacked

Awards
 Spanish Cross in Silver with Swords
 U-boat War Badge
 Iron Cross 2nd Class
 War Merit Cross 1st Class with Swords

References

Bibliography

1907 births
1943 deaths
People from Węgorzewo
People from East Prussia
U-boat commanders (Kriegsmarine)
Reichsmarine personnel
Kriegsmarine personnel killed in World War II
German military personnel of the Spanish Civil War
Recipients of the Iron Cross (1939), 2nd class
People lost at sea
Deaths by airstrike during World War II